Volleyball has been an African Games event since the first edition in 1965 in Brazzaville, Republic of the Congo.

Indoor volleyball

Men

Results 

 A round-robin tournament determined the final standings.

Medal table

Women

Results

Medal table

Participating nations

Beach volleyball

Men

Women

External links 
 Men Volleyball All Africa Games (todor66.com)
 Women Volleyball All Africa Games (todor66.com)

 
All-Africa Games
All-Africa Games